Walter Olmos (1982–2002) was an Argentine singer.

Discography
 2000 A Pura Sangre
 2001 De Catamarca al mundo
 2001 La Locomotora
 2002 De Coleccion

External links
 

20th-century Argentine male singers
1982 births
2002 deaths